Tensing may refer to:
Tenseness (or tensing), a concept in the linguistic fields of phonetics and phonology
Ten Sing, a Christian youth program

See also
Tenzing (name), a Nepalese name